The D.N. Edmiston House is a historic house on Main Street in Canehill, Arkansas.  It is a two-story wood-frame structure, with an L-shaped plan, cross gable roof, weatherboard siding, and a stone foundation.   Its gable ends have decorative brackets, as do the cornice hoods above the windows.  The porch also has decorative bracketed columns.  The house was built in 1886, and is a distinctive local example of vernacular Victorian styling.

The house was listed on the National Register of Historic Places in 1982.

See also
National Register of Historic Places listings in Washington County, Arkansas

References

Houses on the National Register of Historic Places in Arkansas
Houses completed in 1886
Houses in Washington County, Arkansas
National Register of Historic Places in Washington County, Arkansas
Victorian architecture in Arkansas
1886 establishments in Arkansas